Francis Lestock Beaufort (1815–1879), was a son of Sir Francis Beaufort and the author of the Digest of I Criminal Law Procedure in Bengal (1850).

References

1815 births
1879 deaths